Jibilla railway station was located on the Adelaide-Wolseley line serving the Adelaide Hills suburb of Aldgate immediately east of the Yatina Road level crossing. It was located 36.0 km from Adelaide station.

History 

It is unclear when Jibilla station opened. Originally named Halliday's Crossing, it consisted of one 85 metre platform with a waiting shelter opening in the 1940s. 

The station closed on 23 September 1987, when the State Transport Authority withdrew Bridgewater line services between Belair and Bridgewater. The platform has since been demolished.

References

South Australian Railways Working Timetable Book No. 265 effective 30 June 1974

Disused railway stations in South Australia
Railway stations closed in 1987
1987 disestablishments in Australia